Pape Sarr (born 7 December 1977) is a Senegalese former professional footballer who played as a midfielder.

Club career
Sarr is a product of the academy of Saint-Étienne. He played for the club's first team from 1996 to 2001 before signing for Lens. In December 2002, Sarr he completed a two-day trial with Premier League club Everton. In 2004 and 2005, he enjoyed loan spells at Deportivo Alavés and Istres respectively.

International career 
Sarr was a participant in the successful 2002 FIFA World Cup campaign where Senegal reached the quarter-finals. In total, he played 54 games for his country, scoring 3 goals.

Honours
Senegal
Africa Cup of Nations runner-up: 2002

References

External links
 

Serer sportspeople
1977 births
Living people
Senegalese footballers
Senegalese expatriate footballers
Senegal international footballers
2002 FIFA World Cup players
La Liga players
Ligue 1 players
Ligue 2 players
RC Lens players
AS Saint-Étienne players
Deportivo Alavés players
FC Istres players
Stade Brestois 29 players
Paris FC players
Olympique de Valence players
Olympique Noisy-le-Sec players
Footballers from Dakar
2000 African Cup of Nations players
2002 African Cup of Nations players
Expatriate footballers in Spain
Association football midfielders